This is a list of mammals of Madeira, concerning the indigenous mammals of the Portuguese archipelago of Madeira in the North Atlantic ocean. Besides the mammals on the islands, the coastal waters are host to at least nine species of dolphins and ten species of migrating cetaceans. These are protected in the 430,000 km2 Madeiran Marine Mammal Sanctuary.

Conservation status listing and ranking system
The following tags are used to highlight each species' conservation status as assessed by the International Union for Conservation of Nature:

Order: Chiroptera (bats)
The bats' most distinguishing feature is that their forelimbs are developed as wings, making them the only mammals capable of flight. Bat species account for about 20% of all mammals.
 Family: Vespertilionidae
 Genus: Pipistrellus
 Madeira pipistrelle, P. maderensis 
 Genus: Nyctalus
 Lesser noctule, Nyctalus leisleri verrucosus 
 Genus: Plecotus
 Grey long-eared bat, Plecotus austriacus

Order: Carnivora (carnivorans)

Carnivorans include over 260 species, the majority of which eat meat as their primary dietary item. They have a characteristic skull shape and dentition.
Suborder: Pinnipedia
Family: Phocidae
Genus: Monachus
 Mediterranean monk seal, M. monachus

Order: Cetacea (whales)

The order Cetacea includes whales, dolphins and porpoises. They are the mammals most fully adapted to aquatic life with a spindle-shaped nearly hairless body, protected by a thick layer of blubber, and forelimbs and tail modified to provide propulsion underwater.

Suborder: Mysticeti
Family: Balaenidae
Genus: Eubalaena
 North Atlantic right whale, Eubalaena glacialis 
Family: Balaenopteridae
Subfamily: Balaenopterinae
Genus: Balaenoptera
 Blue whale, Balaenoptera musculus  
 Fin whale, Balaenoptera physalus 
 Sei whale, Balaenoptera borealis 
 Minke whale, Balaenoptera acutorostrata 
Subfamily: Megapterinae
Genus: Megaptera
 Humpback whale, Megaptera novaeangliae 
Suborder: Odontoceti
Superfamily: Platanistoidea
Family: Physeteridae
Genus: Physeter
 Sperm whale, Physeter macrocephalus 
Family: Kogiidae
Genus: Kogia
 Pygmy sperm whale, Kogia breviceps >
Superfamily: Delphinoidea
Family: Delphinidae (marine dolphins)
Genus: Tursiops
 Common bottlenose dolphin, Tursiops truncatus 
Genus: Steno
 Rough-toothed dolphin, Steno bredanensis

See also
Lists of mammals by region

References

Further reading

'
mammals
Madeira
Madeira
Madeira